"Eternity" / "The Road to Mandalay" is the fifth single from English singer-songwriter Robbie Williams' third studio album, Sing When You're Winning (2000). "Eternity" does not appear on the album but was later included on Williams' Greatest Hits album in 2004. The lyrics of "Eternity" were written as a tribute to Williams' close friendship with Geri Halliwell. Brian May of Queen plays electric guitar on the track.

Released on 9 July 2001, the double A-side was the 20th-best-selling single of 2001 in the United Kingdom, topping the country's singles chart, and also peaked at number two in Ireland. "Eternity" as a solo single reached number one in New Zealand and became a top-10 hit in eight other countries. Though "Eternity" never appeared on a Robbie Williams studio album, a comedic snippet of the song can be heard in "Outtakes", a hidden track on Swing When You're Winning.

Music videos

The video for "The Road to Mandalay" shows Robbie Williams and four friends driving a Jensen FF and a Ford Transit van, alternatively goofing around and scoping out a money transport van and the people who transport the money in Marseille. When the robbery goes down, Williams and his friends dress with masks covering their faces and run into the transport van with a truck. Holding up a sign with the French words "Ouvrez ou je bute le chien" ("Open or I kill the dog"), and showing the dog of one of the drivers, thus showing they know where to find the driver's family, they quickly move the money to another van, then celebrate while driving off. Williams invites his friends to his new plush house, celebrating with plenty of champagne and cake. The video ends with the van nearly running over an elderly lady, and with Williams waking up startled next to his girlfriend (Australian model Lisa Seiffert).

The video for "Eternity" is a sequel to "The Road to Mandalay". It was directed by Vaughan Arnell. It is mixed with scenes from the first video, which are scenes of Williams and his girlfriend lounging around their house in Spain, playing pool and walking along the beach and jumping on the trampoline. These scenes are also intercut with scenes of Williams and his girlfriend standing opposite each other, looking wistfully at each other. The end of the video shows Williams giving his girlfriend a long parting kiss, then being handcuffed and led away to several waiting Guardia Civil police cars, having been tracked down from clues left at the scene of the robbery.

Track listings
UK CD and cassette single
 "Eternity" – 5:02
 "The Road to Mandalay" – 3:57
 "Toxic" – 3:48

European CD single
 "Eternity" – 5:02
 "The Road to Mandalay" – 3:57

French CD single
 "The Road to Mandalay" – 3:57
 "Eternity" – 5:02

Credits and personnel

"Eternity"
Credits are taken from the Greatest Hits album booklet.

Studio
 Mastered at Metropolis Mastering (London, England)

Personnel

 Robbie Williams – writing, lead vocals
 Guy Chambers – writing, piano, production, arrangement
 Gary Nuttall – backing vocals, acoustic guitar
 Claire Worrall – backing vocals
 Phil Palmer – acoustic guitar
 Brian May – electric guitar
 Melvin Duffy – pedal steel guitar
 B. J. Cole – pedal steel guitar
 Dave Clayton – keyboards
 Andy Duncan – percussion
 Steve Power – production, mixing
 Richard Flack – Pro Tools
 Tony Cousins – mastering

"The Road to Mandalay"
Credits are taken from the Sing When You're Winning album booklet.

Studios
 Recorded at Master Rock Studios (North London, England) and Sarm Hook End (Reading, England)
 Mixed at Battery Studios (London, England)
 Mastered at Metropolis Mastering (London, England)

Personnel

 Robbie Williams – writing, lead vocals
 Guy Chambers – writing, backing vocals, piano, organ, mellotron, clavinet, omnichord, production, arrangement
 Andy Caine – backing vocals
 Steve McEwan – backing vocals
 Phil Palmer – acoustic and electric guitars
 Dave Catlin-Birch – bass guitar
 Melvin Duffy – pedal steel guitar
 Chris Sharrock – drums
 Andy Duncan – drum programming, Pro Tools
 Bob Lanese – trumpet
 Pauline Boeykens – tuba
 Edgar Herzog – clarinet
 Alex Dickson – autoharp
 Steve Power – glockenspiel, production, mixing
 Richard Flack – Pro Tools
 Jim Brumby – Pro Tools
 Tony Cousins – mastering

Charts

Weekly charts

Year-end charts

Certifications

References

2000 songs
2000s ballads
2001 singles
Chrysalis Records singles
Music videos directed by Vaughan Arnell
Number-one singles in New Zealand
Pop ballads
Robbie Williams songs
Song recordings produced by Guy Chambers
Song recordings produced by Steve Power
Songs written by Guy Chambers
Songs written by Robbie Williams
UK Singles Chart number-one singles